CH–CH oxidoreductases are oxidoreductase enzymes that convert single bonds and double bonds between two carbon atoms. They are classified under EC number 1.3.

One example is 5-alpha reductase:

Note the major difference—the Δ4,5 double-bond on the A (leftmost) ring. (The other differences between the diagrams are unrelated to chemical structure.)

See also
Alpha-santonin 1,2-reductase

External links
 

EC 1.3